Russell Ross Francis (born April 3, 1953) is an American former professional football player who was a tight end for thirteen seasons in the National Football League (NFL). He played for the New England Patriots and San Francisco 49ers.

Francis finished his NFL career with 393 receptions for 5,262 yards and 40 touchdowns. He was inducted into the Oregon Sports Hall of Fame in 1993.

In 2021, the Professional Football Researchers Association named Francis to the PFRA Hall of Very Good Class of 2021

Early life
Francis began high school at Kailua High School on Oahu, Hawaii, and finished at Pleasant Hill High School in Oregon, southeast of Eugene. Francis was also a decathlete for Pleasant Hill.

At the University of Oregon in Eugene,  Francis threw the javelin and played only 14 games of varsity football for the Ducks. Injured after three games as a sophomore in 1972, he played in 1973, but sat out his senior season in 1974.

He enrolled at rival Oregon State University in Corvallis in order to expire his collegiate eligibility and be eligible for the 1975 NFL Draft. Briefly a pro wrestler, he trained for the Superstars competition and was selected in the first round by the New England Patriots, the 16th overall pick and signed in May.

NFL career

New England Patriots (1975–1980)
During the Patriots 30–27 win in 1976 over the two-time defending champion Pittsburgh Steelers on September 26, Francis caught a 38-yard touchdown pass from Steve Grogan on fourth and one. In that same game, Francis had a career-best 139 yards receiving. As a result, Howard Cosell proclaimed him as the "All-World Tight End."

In 1980, Francis caught a 23-yard pass from Harold Jackson, on a wide receiver reverse option play, in the Patriots  win over the New York Jets on November 2.  He caught a 12-yard pass from WR Harold Jackson, on the same wide receiver reverse option play, in the Pats'  overtime loss to the Miami Dolphins on Monday Night Football on December 8.

In 1978, Francis had a career-longest 53-yard reception and 126 yards receiving in the Patriots  win over the Oakland Raiders at the Oakland Coliseum on September 24. That season, he led the Patriots in receptions with 39 catches for 543 yards.

Francis was a Pro Bowl selection for three consecutive seasons (1977–1979).

Following the 1980 season, Francis retired from professional football. Two things that Francis has said contributed greatly to this decision were, one, when the Patriots refused to give him his promised bonus for making the Pro Bowl (because his injury from a motorcycle accident kept him out of the game); and, secondly, when his roommate, Darryl Stingley, was paralyzed by a Jack Tatum hit in August 1978, the Patriots tried to cancel Stingley's medical insurance. Francis was the first teammate at Stingley's side immediately after the hit, and he has said it was tough to play after that.

Francis was traded to the defending Super Bowl champion San Francisco 49ers for a draft pick that the Patriots used to select future Hall of Fame linebacker Andre Tippett.

San Francisco 49ers (1982–1987)
After leaving the Patriots, Francis got a job with ABC Sports. While in Hawaii for the Pro Bowl, Francis interviewed Bill Walsh, the 49ers head coach.  Walsh told him this was the only time in his life he would be able to play football, and that he would never get these years back and should not turn his back on this chance. Francis came out of retirement, after sitting out the  season, joined the 49ers and eventually won a Super Bowl ring as a member of the 1984 49ers. Francis played a key role in San Francisco's win over the Miami Dolphins in Super Bowl XIX (5 catches for 60 yards). In 1985, Francis had a career-high 44 receptions.

New England Patriots (1987–1988)
After being waived by the 49ers during the 1987 season, Francis signed with his old team, the Patriots, before the season's final game.  His second tenure in New England was less successful than his first, however, and he played just one more season.  Francis spent 1989 injured before being waived and retiring.

Superstars, Professional wrestling career; Retirement
Francis qualified for The Superstars final and the World Superstars in 1980 and 1981, finishing second in the 1980 final and fourth in 1981.  He won the football preliminary in 1981 and set a record of 23.91 seconds in the  swimming event.  The record stood until 1986, when it was broken by Greg Louganis.

Francis appeared in a 20-man battle royal at WrestleMania 2 along with other NFL stars. He is the son of wrestling promoter Ed Francis, He briefly competed full-time in the American Wrestling Association after retiring from football. He also competed in the National Wrestling Alliance's NWA Hawaii where he held the NWA Hawaii Tag Team Championship one time with his older brother, Billy Roy Francis.

After retiring, he hosted The Russ Francis Show from 8 am to noon on 107.7 WTPL "The Pulse", out of Concord, New Hampshire, and later he hosted Forever West Outdoors from 4 to 6 pm on 1400 AM KODI, out of Cody, Wyoming. In 2015, he was inducted into the Polynesian Football Hall of Fame as a contributor.

Championships and accomplishments
NWA Hawaii
NWA Hawaii Tag Team Championship (1 time) - with Bill Francis

Politics
In 2000 Francis challenged long-time Democratic incumbent, Patsy Mink for Hawaii's 2nd congressional district. Running as a Republican, Francis was defeated, winning 35.97% of the vote to Mink's 61.59%. Mink was elected posthumously, having died one week after she had won the 2002 primary election, too late for her name to be removed from the general election ballot. Her vacant seat was filled by Ed Case after a special election on January 4, 2003.

References

Total Patriots Encyclopedia

External links
Hawaii Sports Hall of Fame Profile
Official New England Patriots Biography

1953 births
Living people
American Conference Pro Bowl players
American football tight ends
College football announcers
New England Patriots players
Oregon Ducks football players
Oregon Ducks men's track and field athletes
People from Pleasant Hill, Oregon
San Francisco 49ers players
Sportspeople from Hawaii
Players of American football from Hawaii
Players of American football from Oregon
National Football League replacement players